Hajjiabad (also Romanized as Ḩājjīābād) is a village in Mokriyan-e Gharbi Rural District, in the Central District of Mahabad County, West Azerbaijan Province, Iran. At the 2006 census, its population was 46, in 8 families.

References 

Populated places in Mahabad County